Illuminate is the second studio album by Lydia.  It was released on March 18, 2008, and reissued by October 21, 2008 on Low Altitude Records.

Track listing

Notes
  The album was streamed entirely on AbsolutePunk.net on March 17, 2008.
 The artwork for the album was designed by and drawn by artist Becky Filip .
 There were only 5,000 copies printed on Linc Star Records.
 Punk76.com was the first international magazine from Germany that reviewed their music.
AbsolutePunk.net named Illuminate their "Best of 2008" in a combined end of the year staff list.

Personnel 
Band
Leighton Antelman - vocals, piano
Steve McGraw - guitar
Craig Taylor - drums
Ethan Koozer - guitar
Mindy White - vocals, piano
Evan Aranbul - bass

Additional musicians
Aaron Marsh - Vocals on "Hospital" and trombone on "All I See"

Production
Produced by Matt Malpass, Leighton Antelman and Steve McGraw
Engineered by Matt Malpass
Mastered by Kim Rosen and Alan Douches

References

External links
Amazon.com Page

Lydia (band) albums
2008 albums